This article refers to sports broadcasting contracts in France. For a list of rights in other countries, see Sports television broadcast contracts.

Athletics
Paris Marathon: France Télévisions until 2020
French Championships in Athletics: RMC Sport
IAAF World Championships in Athletics: France Télévisions & Eurosport until 2017
European Athletics Championships: France Télévisions & Eurosport
IAAF World Indoor Championships in Athletics: France Télévisions & Eurosport
IAAF Diamond League: RMC Sport except Canal+ for the Herculis in Monaco
European Cup: France Télévisions & Eurosport

Basketball
NBA: beIN Sports
WNBA: beIN Sports
FIBA Basketball World Cup: Canal+ and France Télévisions 
EuroBasket: Canal+ and France Télévisions
FIBA Women's Basketball World Cup: Canal+ and France Télévisions 
EuroBasket Women: Canal+ and France Télévisions
Ligue Nationale de Basketball: L'Équipe and Sport en France
Euroleague: RMC Sport
France national basketball team: RMC Story (free)
Ligue Féminine de Basketball: Sport en France
EuroLeague Women: Sport en France
France women's national basketball team: RMC Story (free)
NCAA: RMC Story (free)

Boxing
Premier Boxing Champions: beIN Sports (selected major and PPV fights), Canal+ Sport and RMC Sport (most PPV fights)
Matchroom Boxing: DAZN
Top Rank: beIN Sports (until 2022)
Golden Boy: DAZN
Dream Boxing: DAZN: October 2022 to October 2025, all fights

American Football
NFL: L'Équipe (2020–present) (Sunday games and play-offs (inc. Super Bowl))

Cycling
Tour de France: France Télévisions & Eurosport until 2025 
Paris–Nice: France Télévisions & Eurosport until 2020
Paris–Roubaix: France Télévisions
UCI ProTour: France Télévisions & Eurosport until 2020
Vuelta a España: Eurosport until 2020
Giro d'Italia: L'Equipe (free) until 2020
Milan–San Remo: L'Equipe (free) until 2020
Tour de Romandie: L'Equipe (free) until 2020
Tour des Flandres: France Télévisions & Eurosport until 2017
Track Cycling World Championships: France Télévisions & Eurosport
World Road Cycling Championships: France Télévisions & Eurosport
European Road Cycling Championships: France Télévisions & Eurosport
French National Road Race Championships: France Télévisions & Eurosport

Football
National teams

FIFA World Cup: TF1 and beIN Sports for 2022.
FIFA U-20 World Cup: Canal+ until 2021.
FIFA U-17 World Cup: Canal+ until 2021.
FIFA World Cup Qualifiers: 
UEFA:
L'Équipe, TMC, TFX, W9 (all matches except those of France)
TF1, and M6 (France matches only)
FIFA Women's World Cup: TF1, TMC, and Canal+ for 2019.
FIFA U-20 Women's World Cup: Canal+ until 2022.
FIFA U-17 Women's World Cup: Canal+ until 2022.
UEFA European Championship: TF1, M6 (23 of 51 matches live, including opening group match, all France matches, both semi finals, and a final), and beIN Sports for 2020.
UEFA Nations League: L'Équipe (selected group stage matches only), TMC, TFX, W9 (exclude France matches), TF1, and M6 (France matches only) 2018-2021
UEFA European Qualifiers: 
L'Équipe, TMC, TFX, W9 (exclude France matches)
TF1, and M6 (France matches only).
UEFA teams Friendly Matches (exclude France team): L'Équipe, TMC, TFX, and W9 2018-2022.
UEFA European Under-21 Championship: France Télévisions for 2021.
UEFA European Youth Championships : L'Équipe (U-19 matches) and RMC Sport (U-17 matches)
UEFA Women's Championship: TF1 (14 matches, including opening group match, all France matches, both semi finals, and a final) and Canal+ (all 31 matches live) for 2021.
France national football team: TF1 and M6 until 2022.
France national under-21 football team: Canal+ (exclude Euro finals tournament in 2021)
France women's national football team: W9 2018-2023
Brasil Global Tour: beIN Sports
Copa América: beIN Sports for 2019.
Africa Cup of Nations: beIN Sports for 2019.

Clubs

International

FIFA Club World Cup: Canal+ (2022)

France

LFP (France) (2020-2024): Amazon Prime (all three (Trophée des Champions (2020-2023) and both leagues)) and other broadcasters (Leagues only)
Ligue 1: Canal+
Ligue 2: beIN Sports
Coupe de France: France Télévisions and beIN Sports until 2026.
Championnat National: Canal+
French women's football league: France Télévisions, Eurosport & Canal+
Coupe de France féminine: France Télévisions and beIN Sports until 2026.

Europe
UEFA Champions League: TF1 (2020 and 2021 (two of four semi-finals (if French club involved only, only one match in 2020) and a final), as well as until 2024 (final only)), Canal+ and beIN Sports (from 2021–22 until 2023–24).
UEFA Europa League: RMC Sport and RMC Story until 2021. M6 and Canal+ from 2021 until 2024.
UEFA Europa Conference League: M6 and Canal+ from 2021 until 2024.
UEFA Super Cup: RMC Sport until 2020. Canal+ and or beIN Sports from 2021 until 2023.
UEFA Youth League: RMC Sport until 2020-21. Canal+ or beIN Sports from 2021 until 2024.
UEFA Women's Champions League: DAZN 2021-2025
Premier League: Canal+ and RMC Sport until 2022.
FA Cup: beIN Sports until 2021.
FA Community Shield: beIN Sports until 2020.
EFL: beIN Sports until 2022
Cup
Championship
League One
League Two
LFP (Spain): beIN Sports until 2021
La Liga
La Liga 2 (promotion play-offs only)
RFEF: L'Équipe 2020 until 2025
Copa del Rey
Supercopa de Españ
Serie A: beIN Sports until 2021
Bundesliga: beIN Sports until 2021.
DFL-Supercup: beIN Sports until 2020.
DFB-Pokal: YouTube (first round until quarter finals) and L'Équipe (three matches, only aired both semi-finals and a final))
Primeira Liga: RMC Sport
Taça de Portugal: L'Équipe (final only)
Russian Premier League: YouTube
Eliteserien: Eurosport
Allsvenskan: Eurosport

America
CONMEBOL Libertadores: Canal+ (final only, in 2019)
Argentine Primera División: Fanatiz
Copa Argentina: Fanatiz
Campeonato Brasileiro Serie A: Fanatiz until 2021
CONCACAF Champions League: YouTube

Asia
A-League: YouTube
W-League: YouTube
J.League: YouTube
K League: YouTube
Saudi Professional League: RMC Sport

Futsal
UEFA Futsal Champions League: UEFA.tv (final four only)

Golf
Ryder Cup: Canal+ 
The Open Championship: Canal+ 
U.S. Open: Canal+ 
The Masters: Canal+ 
PGA Championship: Canal+ 
PGA European Tour: Canal+ 
World Golf Championships: Canal+ 
PGA Tour: Canal+
LPGA Tour: Golf Channel France
Solheim Cup: Golf Channel France
Asian Tour: Golf Channel France

Handball
IHF World Men's Handball Championship: TF1 and beIN Sports until 2019
IHF World Women's Handball Championship: beIN Sports and France Télévisions until 2019
European Men's Handball Championship: TF1 (until 2024) and beIN Sports
European Women's Handball Championship:  TF1 (until 2024) and beIN Sports
French Championship: beIN Sports until 2019
Women's French Championship: beIN Sport until 2017
France men's national handball team: beIN Sports until 2019
France women's national handball team: beIN Sports until 2019.
EHF Champions League: Eurosport
French Cup: L'Équipe
French League Cup: beIN Sports until 2019

Ice hockey
NHL: Canal+
Ligue Magnus: Sport en France
IIHF World Championships: La Chaîne L'Équipe

Kickboxing
King of Kings: DAZN: October 2022 to October 2025, all fights

Mixed Martial Arts
Ultimate Fighting Championship: RMC Sport
Bellator MMA: RMC Sport
Professional Fighters League: RMC Sport
Combate Global: RMC Sport
Bushido MMA: DAZN: October 2022 to October 2025, all fights
MMA Grand Prix: Sport en France

Motor Sport
Formula One: Canal+, with the 4 other races (French and Monaco Grand Prix plus 2 selected races) co-aired by TF1
FIA Formula 2 Championship: Canal+
FIA Formula 3 Championship: Canal+
Dakar Rally: France Télévisions until 2020
Formula Truck: Eurosport
IndyCar Series: Canal+ Sport
Formula E: Canal+, Eurosport
Le Mans 24 Hour: France Télévisions, Eurosport
FIA World Endurance Championship: L'Équipe
FIA World Rallycross Championship: L'Équipe
World Touring Car Cup: Eurosport
World Rally Championship: Motors TV & L'Equipe 21
Andros Trophy: L'Équipe
MotoGP: Canal+ (since 2019)
Superbike World Championship: Eurosport
Deutsche Tourenwagen Masters: Automoto

Multi-discipline Events
Olympic Games: France Télévisions until 2024 and Eurosport
Paralympic Games: France Télévisions until 2024

Rugby

Union 

World Rugby
Rugby World Cup 2019: TF1
World Rugby Sevens Series: Canal+ Sport
Six Nations: France Télévisions
France national rugby union team: France Televisions
End of Year Rugby Union Tests: (England Rugby Union, Ireland Rugby Union, Scotland Rugby Union and Wales Rugby Union matches) Canal+ Sport for England and Ireland beIN Sports for Wales and Scotland
EPCR (through 2022): France Télévisions (top pick of each round) and beIN Sports.
European Champions Cup
European Challenge Cup
LNR: Canal+
Top 14: final is co-aired by France 2.
Rugby Pro D2: also available on Eurosport and France 3.
SANZAAR: Canal+
International Test Matches (including Rugby Championship and excluding France home internationals)
Super Rugby
English Premiership: RMC Sport
Pro14: beIN Sport

League 

Super League: beIN Sports
National Rugby League: beIN Sports
State of Origin: beIN Sports
Elite One Championship: ViàOccitanie

Sailing
Vendée Globe: RMC Story (free)

Swimming
FINA World Aquatics Championships: France Télévisions & Canal+ until 2019
LEN European Aquatics Championships: France Télévisions & Eurosport until 2020

Tennis
French Open: France Télévisions, Amazon Prime Video (both until 2023)
Wimbledon: beIN Sports until 2023
US Open: Eurosport until 2022
Australian Open: Eurosport until 2031
Davis Cup: TF1 (France matches only) and beIN Sports
Billie Jean King Cup: France Télévisions (France matches only) and beIN Sports until 2022
ATP Finals: Eurosport until 2023
ATP Tour Masters 1000: Eurosport also Monte-Carlo Masters and Paris Masters on C8 (Semifinals and Finals only)
ATP Tour 500: Eurosport until 2023
ATP Tour 250: Eurosport and beIN Sports 
WTA Tour: beIN Sports until 2026
United Cup:
Laver Cup: beIN Sports

Volleyball

 FIVB Volleyball Men's and Women's Nations League : L'Équipe
 FIVB Men's and Women's World Championships : L'Équipe

Winter sports
 FIS Alpine Ski & Nordic Ski World Championships: Eurosport
 Snowboard: L'Équipe & RMC Sport
 Biathlon: Eurosport & L'Équipe
 Bobsled & skeleton: L'Équipe

References 

France
Sports mass media in France